The Best from the Noise Years is the first compilation album by German heavy metal band Rage, released in 1998 by Victor Entertainment. The album is made up of 15 songs from the band's early albums (1986–94), released by Noise Records.

Track listing

Personnel

Band members 
Peter "Peavy" Wagner – vocals, bass
Jochen Schroeder – guitars, on tracks 1-2
Rudy Graf – guitars, on tracks 1-2
Jörg Michael – drums, on tracks 1-2
Manni Schmidt – guitars, on tracks 3-14
Chris Ephthimiadis – drums, on tracks 3-14
Sven Fischer – guitars, on track 15
Spiros Efthimiadis – guitars, on track 15
Chris Ephthimiadis – drums, on track 15

Production 
Sven Conquest – producer, engineer, mixing
Armin Sabol – producer

Rage (German band) albums
Victor Entertainment compilation albums
Noise Records compilation albums
1998 compilation albums
Speed metal compilation albums